Joseph Robert Martin (August 1, 1926 – February 17, 2008) was a Canadian politician. He served in the Legislative Assembly of New Brunswick from 1957 to 1960 as member of the Progressive Conservative party.

References

1926 births
2008 deaths
New Brunswick Liberal Association MLAs